Lackie is the surname of:

 Darren Lackie, drummer for We Were Promised Jetpacks, a Scottish indie rock band
 Ethel Lackie (1907–1979), American Olympic swimmer
 Mark Lackie (born 1967), Canadian short track speed skater

See also
 Lackey (disambiguation)